Carlton Hotels & Suites — is a Dubai based multinational hospitality company that manages Hotels mostly in the Middle East and across the Europe. It was founded 1977 with Carlton Tower Hotel in Deira and was the first 5 star Hotel in Dubai. The Hotel chain consists of 9 direct managing hotels & 3 franchise operated hotels.

Carlton Hotels & Suites are headquartered in the right of the twin towers just behind Burj Khalifa, on the Sheikh Zayed Road in Dubai, U.A.E.

History
Carlton Hotels & Suites are owned by the First Investor LLC. A subsidiary of the Al Fardan Group of Holdings – who have over 25 years of global investment experience. The first Carlton Hotel were established in October 1977. Nowadays, the company made a huge leap by joining more properties. In 2017, iconic Carlton Downtown Hotel joined to the chain. In 2018, the CEO of the Carlton Hotels & Suites, Mr Hosni Abdelhadi has shared even further expanding plans and that Carlton Hotels will grow in Stature. As of now, the Hotel chain operates 12 Hotels in 3 countries on 2 continents with a total of 1,156 direct operations hotel rooms. Last of the hotel was added to the chain in February 2020. Currently, there is one more direct Hotel under the construction - Carlton Dubai Creek, which scheduled to open in early 2022.

Achievements
 Carlton Downtown is occupying one of the twin towers, which previously known as Angsana Hotel & Suites property. This building included as one of the top-30 tallest Hotels in the World and having one of the highest open rooftop with the pool in the world.
 On the Holy month of Ramadan in 2017, Carlton Downtown Hotel has claimed that they have installed the highest Ramadan tent in the World. Carlton Downtown in particular is famous for its unique celebrations of Ramadan and attracts many tourists from around the Globe for this holiday.
 In 2019, Hotelier Middle East magazine, has included the CEO of the Carlton Hotels & Suites as one of the top-50 influenced Hospitality, placing on 37th place

Room Quantity
As of now, Carlton Hotels & Suites have a total of 1156 rooms:

Properties
There are total of 14 properties operated by Carlton Hotels & Suites, whereas 5 of them are operated directly.

Direct Management
 Carlton Downtown, Dubai, UAE
 Carlton Palace Hotel, Dubai, UAE
 Carlton Tower Hotel, Dubai, UAE
 Carlton Al Barsha Hotel, Dubai, UAE
 Carlton Dubai Creek Hotel, Dubai, UAE

Standalone Ownership
This hotels operates under standalone names, but owned by Carlton Hotels & Suites:
 Imperial Palace by Carlton, Amman, Jordan
 Hotel Sun, Mariánské Lázně, Czech Republic
 Belvedere Hotel, Mariánské Lázně, Czech Republic
 Spa Hotel, Prague, Czech Republic
 Hotel Lázně Jáchymov, Jáchymov, Czech Republic

Owned Franchising
There are also 4 franchises that are operated by other hotel chains:
 Marriott Executive Apartments, Dubai, UAE
 Rotana Hotels, Dubai, UAE
 Four Points by Sheraton, Dubai, UAE
 Best Western, Dubai, UAE

See also 
List of chained-brand hotels
List of tallest hotels
List of tallest buildings in Dubai

References 

Hotel and leisure companies of the United Arab Emirates
Hotel chains in the United Arab Emirates
Emirati brands
Companies based in Dubai
Skyscraper hotels in Dubai
Hotels in Dubai
Hospitality companies of the United Arab Emirates